The Rosenberg Brothers Department Store building is located in downtown Albany, Georgia, USA. The three-story brick structure was built in 1924 in an Italianate/Neo-Renaissance Classical Revival style by J.C. Hind and J. T. Murphy.

Jacob Rosenberg was a Jewish merchant who leased a store at this prominent corner lot in 1896. The site was owned by the Tift family, who founded Albany. Rosenberg had a new department store building constructed on the site in 1923 in a Second Renaissance Revival architecture style. It continued in business until 1978 when a second Rosenberg's location opened within the, then new, Albany Mall in 1976. Gray Communications bought and renovated the building in 1985 to house the Albany Herald.

The building, and several nearby buildings, were sold to the city of Albany for $850,000. The Herald, which occupied the building for more than three decades, moved out in December 2019.

References

Commercial buildings on the National Register of Historic Places in Georgia (U.S. state)
Buildings and structures in Albany, Georgia
Department stores on the National Register of Historic Places
National Register of Historic Places in Dougherty County, Georgia